A - B - C - D - E - F - G - H - I - J - K - L - M - N - O - P - Q - R - S - T - U - V - W - XYZ

This is a list of rivers in the United States that have names starting with the letter L.  For the main page, which includes links to listings by state, see List of rivers in the United States.

La 
La Crosse River - Wisconsin
La Moine River - Illinois
La Plata River - Colorado, New Mexico
Lac qui Parle River - Minnesota
Lackawanna River - Pennsylvania
Lackawaxen River - Pennsylvania
Lafayette River - Virginia
Lagunitas Creek - California
Lake River - Washington
Lake Fork Mohican River - Ohio
Lamar River - Wyoming
Lamine River - Missouri
Lamington River - New Jersey
Lamoille River - Vermont
Lampasas River - Texas
Lamprey River - New Hampshire
Lane River - New Hampshire
L'Anguille River - Arkansas
Laramie River - Colorado, Wyoming
Laughing Whitefish River - Michigan
Laurel Fork (Cheat River) - West Virginia
Laurel Fork (Clear Fork Guyandotte River) - West Virginia
Lavaca River - Texas

Le 
Le Sueur River - Minnesota
Leading Creek - Ohio
Leading Creek (Little Kanawha River) - West Virginia
Leading Creek (Tygart Valley River) - West Virginia
Leaf River - Illinois
Leaf River - Minnesota
Leaf River - Mississippi
Leatherwood Creek - western Ohio
Leatherwood Creek - eastern Ohio
Lees River - Massachusetts
Left Hand Creek - Colorado
Lehigh River - Pennsylvania
Leipsic River - Delaware
Leland River - Michigan
Lemhi River - Idaho
Lemonweir River - Wisconsin
Lens Creek - West Virginia
Leon River - Texas
Lester River - Minnesota
River Lethe - Alaska
Levisa Fork River - Virginia, Kentucky
Lewis River - Washington
Lewis River - Wyoming
Lewis and Clark River - Oregon

Li - Ll 
Licking River - Kentucky
Licking River - Ohio
Link River - Oregon
Linville River - North Carolina
Little River - Alabama
Little River - California
Little River - Delaware
Little River - Florida (Biscayne Bay)
Little River - Florida (Gadsden County)
Little River - Indiana
Little River - Kentucky
Little River - Louisiana
Little River - Missouri, Arkansas
Little River - New Hampshire (multiple)
Little River - Oklahoma
Little River - Oklahoma, Arkansas
Little River - Oregon
Little River - tributary of Broad River, South Carolina
Little River - eastern South Carolina
Little River - Tennessee
Little River - Texas
Little River - northern Virginia
Little River - southwestern Virginia
Little River - West Virginia
Little River - Wisconsin
Little Arkansas River - Kansas
Little Auglaize River - Ohio
Little Baraboo River - Wisconsin
Little Barren River - Kentucky
Little Bear River - Utah
Little Beaver Creek - Ohio
Little Bighorn River - Wyoming, Montana
Little Birch River - West Virginia
Little Blackwater River - Maryland
Little Blackwater River - West Virginia
Little Blue River - Kansas, Nebraska
Little Blue River - Missouri
Little Bluestone River - West Virginia
Little Boise Brule River - Wisconsin
Little Buffalo River - Tennessee
Little Cacapon River - West Virginia
Little Choctawhatchee River - Alabama
Little Coal River - West Virginia
Little Cobb River - Minnesota
Little Colorado River - Arizona
Little Conemaugh River - Pennsylvania
Little Cottonwood River - Minnesota
Little Cuyahoga River - Ohio
Little Darby Creek - Ohio
Little Deschutes River - Oregon
Little Doe River - Tennessee
Little Duck River - Tennessee
Little Eau Pleine River - Wisconsin
Little Econlockhatchee River - Florida
Little Emory River - Tennessee
Little Grant River - Wisconsin
Little Green River - Wisconsin
Little Harpeth River - Tennessee
Little Hocking River - Ohio
Little Humboldt River - Nevada
Little Indian River - Michigan
Little Juniata River - Pennsylvania
Little Kanawha River - West Virginia
Little Kentucky River - Kentucky
Little La Crosse River - Wisconsin
Little Laramie River - Wyoming
Little Le Sueur River - Minnesota
Little Lemonweir River - Wisconsin
Little Lost River - Idaho
Little Mackinaw River - Illinois
Little Magothy River - Maryland
Little Manatee River - Florida
Little Manitowoc River - Wisconsin
Little Maquoketa River - Iowa
Little Marys River - Illinois
Little Medicine Bow River - Wyoming
Little Menominee River - Wisconsin, Illinois
Little Miami River - Ohio
Little Minnesota River - South Dakota, Minnesota
Little Missouri River - Arkansas
Little Missouri River - Wyoming, North Dakota
Little Monocacy River - Maryland
Little Muddy Creek - North Dakota
Little Muddy River - Illinois
Little Muskingum River - Ohio
Little Nestucca River - Oregon
Little Niangua River - Missouri
Little Obed River - Tennessee
Little Ohoopee River - Georgia
Little Osage River - Kansas, Missouri
Little Pamet River - Massachusetts
Little Partridge River - Minnesota
Little Pee Dee River - South Carolina
Little Pigeon River - Tennessee
Little Platte River - Wisconsin
Little Pokegama River - Wisconsin
Little Red River - Arkansas, Louisiana
Little Rib River - Wisconsin
Little Rock River - Minnesota, Iowa
Little Salkehatchie River - South Carolina
Little Sandy River - Kentucky
Little Sandy River - South Carolina
Little Schuylkill River - Pennsylvania
Little Scioto River - Ohio (Ohio River tributary)
Little Scioto River - Ohio (Scioto River tributary)
Little Sequatchie River - Tennessee
Little Sioux River - Iowa
Little Sioux River - Wisconsin
Little Snake River - Colorado, Wyoming
Little Somo River - Wisconsin
Little Spokane River - Washington
Little Sugar River - New Hampshire
Little Sugar River - Wisconsin
Little Sur River - California
Little Susitna River - Alaska
Little Tallapoosa River - Alabama
Little Tennessee River - Georgia, North Carolina, Tennessee
Little Thompson River - Colorado
Little Thornapple River - tributary of the Coldwater River, Michigan
Little Thornapple River - Eaton County, Michigan
Little Thornapple River - Sawyer and Rusk counties, Wisconsin
Little Thornapple River - Sawyer County, Wisconsin
Little Trappe River - Wisconsin
Little Truckee River - California
Little Turtle River - Wisconsin
Little Vermilion River (Illinois River tributary) - Illinois
Little Vermilion River (Wabash River tributary) - Illinois, Indiana
Little Wabash River - Illinois
Little Walker River - California
Little Warrior River - Alabama
Little White River - South Dakota
Little Wolf River - Wisconsin
Little Wood River - Idaho
Little Yellow River - Wisconsin
Llano River - Texas

Lo 
Lochsa River - Idaho
Locust Fork of the Black Warrior River - Alabama
Lodgepole Creek - Wyoming, Nebraska, Colorado
Logan River - Utah
Long Prairie River - Minnesota
Long Tom River - Oregon
Looking Glass River - Michigan
Loop Creek - West Virginia
Loosahatchie River - Tennessee
Loramie Creek - Ohio
Los Angeles River - California
Lost River - California, Oregon
Lost River - Indiana
Lost River - New Hampshire
Lost River - West Virginia
Lostine River - Oregon
Loup River - Nebraska
Loutre River - Missouri
Lovell River - New Hampshire
Loxahatchee River - Florida
Loyalhanna Creek - Pennsylvania
Loyalsock Creek - Pennsylvania

Lu - Ly 
Luckiamute River - Oregon
Lumber River - North Carolina
Lummi River - Washington
Lycoming Creek - Pennsylvania
Lynches River - North Carolina, South Carolina
Lynnhaven River - Virginia
Lyre River - Washington

Lists of rivers of the United States